The 2004 Sirius at The Glen was the 22nd stock car race of the 2004 NASCAR Nextel Cup Series season and the 19th iteration of the event. The race was held on Sunday, August 15, 2004, in Watkins Glen, New York at the shortened layout of Watkins Glen International, a 2.454 miles (3.949 km) permanent road course. The race took the scheduled 90 laps to complete. At race's end, a sick Tony Stewart, driving for Joe Gibbs Racing, would be able to overcome sickness and soiling himself during the race, defending against Ron Fellows of Dale Earnhardt, Inc. to win his 19th career NASCAR Nextel Cup Series win and his second and final win of the season. To fill out the podium, Mark Martin of Roush Racing would finish third.

Background 

Watkins Glen International (nicknamed "The Glen") is an automobile race track located in Watkins Glen, New York at the southern tip of Seneca Lake. It was long known around the world as the home of the Formula One United States Grand Prix, which it hosted for twenty consecutive years (1961–1980), but the site has been home to road racing of nearly every class, including the World Sportscar Championship, Trans-Am, Can-Am, NASCAR Sprint Cup Series, the International Motor Sports Association and the IndyCar Series.

Initially, public roads in the village were used for the race course. In 1956 a permanent circuit for the race was built. In 1968 the race was extended to six hours, becoming the 6 Hours of Watkins Glen. The circuit's current layout has more or less been the same since 1971, although a chicane was installed at the uphill Esses in 1975 to slow cars through these corners, where there was a fatality during practice at the 1973 United States Grand Prix. The chicane was removed in 1985, but another chicane called the "Inner Loop" was installed in 1992 after J.D. McDuffie's fatal accident during the previous year's NASCAR Winston Cup event.

The circuit is known as the Mecca of North American road racing and is a very popular venue among fans and drivers. The facility is currently owned by International Speedway Corporation.

Entry list

Practice 
Originally, three practice sessions were scheduled to be held, with one on Friday and two on Saturday, However, constant rain on Friday meant the only practice session on Friday would be canceled. The two Saturday sessions were ran as planned.

First practice 
The first practice session would occur on Saturday, August 14, at 9:30 AM EST and would last for 45 minutes.

Second and final practice 
The second and final practice session, sometimes referred to as Happy Hour, would occur on Saturday, August 14, at 11:10 AM EST and would last for 45 minutes.

Starting lineup 
Qualifying was scheduled to be held on Friday, August 13, at 3:10 PM EST. However, constant rain during Friday would cancel all on-track activities. The lineup was then determined by the current 2004 owner's points. As a result, Jimmie Johnson of Hendrick Motorsports won the pole.

Four drivers would fail to qualify: Scott Pruett, Boris Said, Klaus Graf, and Stanton Barrett.

Full starting lineup

Race results

References 

2004 NASCAR Nextel Cup Series
NASCAR races at Watkins Glen International
August 2004 sports events in the United States
2004 in sports in New York (state)